Nodocarpaea is a genus of flowering plants belonging to the family Rubiaceae.

Its native range is Cuba.

Species:
 Nodocarpaea radicans (Griseb.) A.Gray

References

Rubiaceae
Rubiaceae genera